Amda Seyon I's Expansions (1314–1344) were a territorial expansion during the reign of Ethiopian Emperor Amda Seyon I. Motivated by religious, commercial and necessarily territorial, Amda Seyon embarked the first conquest to Gojjam and Hadiya in 1316, by forcibly seizing the Enderta Province where there was resistance. 

The expansions continued by ambushing militarily to non-Christian population eventually culminated in conflict with the neighbor Muslim satellite kingdoms. The Christian Ethiopian Empire initially conquered Damot, followed by Shewa in 1285, Ifat in 1415, and the Adal Sultanate in 1520.

Course 
While Emperor Yekuno Amlak considered as the founder of state, the Ethiopian state further expanded by the reign of Amda Seyon I (r. 1314–1344). This had ensued major reforms of its administration and dramatic expansion of its frontier.

He inherited his father Wedem Arad's stable relationship while the empire posed a threat in its military and economic situations. In addition, his reign brought Ethiopia to balance of power. One of his first steps was to bring the Tigray Province under his control by forcibly subduing the legitimacy to his Amhara-ruled dynasty despite opposition from religious and political leaders in Axum. In Enderta, the resistance momentum was very high among the descendants of Yekuno Amlak where the governor took almost independent power, who did not want to grant land to Amda Seyon in 1319. In reaction to refusal, he made punitive expedition to Ya'ebika Egzi revolt. The 14th century national epic Kebra Nagast further elaborated the Amda Seyon expansions, which described it as quick and successful. 

Amda Seyon expansions considered by many scholars religious, commercial, and necessarily territorial, where the territorial expansionism classified as colonization. He also annexed Muslim kingdoms, although his empire tribute from more or less autonomous regions instead of imposing direct control. In 1316, he controlled Gojjam Province and Hadiya. There were also report to monks ambushed by military groups with heavy casualties, and non-Christians were killed by these group. 

During the initial phase of conquest of the empire, the first submitted kingdom was Damot, followed by Showa in 1285, Ifat in 1415, while this surrender continued after his death through the Adal (1520) and eventually Harar, which became an important place for the Muslims. Ifat was soon supported by Hadiya ruler named Amano to fight his expansion. In 1329, the Muslims controlled the area from the coast of Eritrea across Mareb and all the Tigray south of Axum. During the period of the Ifat Sultanate resurrection, one ruler titled Amir or Imam opposed Amda Seyon march against Zeila, which the imam was defeated and slain in 1332. The Muslim sultanates then launched resistant campaign, as the Emperor defeated Ifat and Hadiya, without reaching Awash River.

See also
 Territorial evolution of Ethiopia

References

Ethiopian Empire
14th century in Ethiopia